Latitude 43 Motorsports is a disbanded NASCAR team that competed in the Sprint Cup Series in 2010. They last fielded the No. 26 Ford Fusion for Boris Said, Bill Elliott, David Stremme, and Patrick Carpentier. The team was started after Vermont businessman Bill Jenkins purchased the team from Roush Fenway Racing to satisfy NASCAR's limit of four cars per race team. As a result, the owner's points were transferred and the team was guaranteed entry into the first five races of 2010. The team folded at the end of the season, with the equipment and sponsors moving to crew chief Frank Stoddard's Go FAS Racing.

History

After the 2009 season, Roush Racing was forced to cede one of its 5 Sprint Cup teams to satisfy NASCAR's limit of four. Roush sold the No. 26 team of Jamie McMurray and its owner points to Bill Jenkins.

The No. 26 Ford started off in the 2010 NASCAR Sprint Cup Series with Boris Said as driver in the 2010 Daytona 500 with Window World Cares sponsorship, led one lap, and finished the race in 25th after being involved in a couple of accidents. The team's next race was at Auto Club Speedway a week later. They got sponsorship from Sacred Power, a New Mexico-based renewable energy company owned by Native Americans. They finished 38th.

David Stremme took over for the team at Bristol with Air Guard as a donated sponsor. For the Gillette Fusion ProGlide 500, the team picked up sponsorship from GlobeTrack Wireless. At Sonoma, Said returned, led eight laps and finished eighth.  Boris Said left the team because he said Jenkins wasn't being fair with his employees, and ended up in the 83 Red Bull Toyota for 1 race, wishing Stremme good luck. Patrick Carpentier ran at Watkins Glen and Michigan after Stremme left on similarly unfriendly terms. Carpentier and Jeff Green split the ride for the remainder of the 2010 season. Ken Schrader drove the car at Martinsville, Bill Elliott ran at Talladega, and J. J. Yeley at Phoenix. The team failed to qualify for nine events and finished 37th in owner's points.

The team closed up shop at the end of the 2010 season and sold their equipment to fellow New Englander Frank Stoddard and his new team FAS Lane Racing.

Car No. 26 results

References

External links 
Bill Jenkins Owner Stats

Companies based in North Carolina
Defunct NASCAR teams
Auto racing teams established in 2010
Auto racing teams disestablished in 2010
2010 establishments in North Carolina
2010 disestablishments in North Carolina